Two Wives for Henry is a 1933 British comedy film directed by Adrian Brunel and starring Garry Marsh, Dorothy Boyd and Jack Raine. A man decides to take a "substitute" wife with him for a vacation in Brighton, but things soon begin to go wrong.

The film was a quota quickie made at Wembley Studios by the independent producer George Smith as part of a contract from Fox who needed a supply of films to distribute in order to comply with the terms of the quota.

Cast
 Garry Marsh as Henry Stetson
 Dorothy Boyd as Estelle Stetson
 Jack Raine as Hugo Horsfal
 Andreas Malandrinos as Gonzalez
 Paul Sheridan as Alphonse Pujol
 Millicent Wolf as Vera

Bibliography
 Chibnall, Steve. Quota Quickies: The Birth of the British 'B' film. British Film Institute, 2007.
 Low, Rachael. History of the British Film: Filmmaking in 1930s Britain. George Allen & Unwin, 1985 .

External links

1933 films
1933 comedy films
British comedy films
Films shot at Wembley Studios
Films directed by Adrian Brunel
Films set in Brighton
Films set in Sussex
Films set in England
British black-and-white films
1930s English-language films
1930s British films
Quota quickies